Vi Kan Inte Stoppas (Can't Stop Us Now) is the fourth album by the Swedish hard rock band Jerusalem, released in 1983. The Swedish version was released on Royal Music. The English version was released in 1984 on Refuge Records in the United States.

Track listing
All songs by Ulf Christiansson.

Swedish version
 "Vi kan inte stoppas"
 "Loves You More"
 "Vinden blåser..."
 "I skuggan av det förflutna"
 "Kärlekseld"
 "Let's Go (Dancin')"
 "Sorgsnas parad"
 "Regn"
 "Pusselbiten"
 "Heartbeat"

English version
 "Can't Stop Us Now"
 "Loves You More"
 "The Wind is Blowing"
 "Tomorrow's World"
 "The Waiting"
 "Let's Go (Dancin')"
 "Mourner's Parade"
 "Read Between the Lines"
 "The Missing Piece"
 "Heartbeat"

Personnel
 Ulf Christiansson – lead vocals, guitar
 Mikael Ulvsgärd – drums
 Peter Carlsohn – bass guitar
 Dan Tibell – keyboards

References

1983 albums
Jerusalem (Swedish band) albums